The Air Force of the Albanian People's Army (FASH), was the Air Force of the People's Socialist Republic of Albania, which was very active during the Cold War period.

History 

The Albanian People's Army Air Force was formed in 1947 with a gift of twelve Yakovlev Yak-3 fighters and a few Polikarpov Po-2 biplane trainers from the Soviet Union, with Soviet personnel seconded as instructors and advisers.

The Albanian Air Force was officially established on April 24, 1951. The first aircraft were Soviet Yak-18 aircraft produced after World War II and initially used at Laprakë on the outskirts of the Albanian capital of Tirana. A few years later, the Albanian Air Force should also be equipped with jet fighters. The first squadron of MiG-15 fighter aircraft with the NATO code "Fagot", titled "Peza", was formed in 1955. This squadron was deployed at Kuçovo Airport.

In later years, as part of military aid from the Soviet Union, the Albanian Air Force is also equipped with the MiG-17, NATO code "Fresco" and MiG-19, NATO code "Farmer" types, and in the early 1970s with MiG-21 fighter aircraft from Chinese production. The fighter jets that came from China had different brands than the Soviet ones, but in the Albanian Air Force they were always identified with the Soviet brand. In June 1957, the first transport regiment was created, armed with Mi-1 helicopters (3 pieces), new Mi-4 helicopters (3 pieces), as well as some Yak-18 and PO-2 propeller aircraft. In 1967, this regiment was expanded in capacity with the arrival of 30 Mi-4 helicopters.

Combat operations

First Operation
The first operation of FASH were undertaken by the  Albanian anti-aircraft regiment units and they hit and shot down a Greek Spitfire type plane that had violated Albanian airspace for a spying mission. The Greek plane was destroyed and the pilot was found dead.

Second Operation
In August 1949, the anti-aircraft units of the same Regiment hit and shot down another Greek plane during the August Provocations. The Greek plane, damaged by the Ali Demi anti-aircraft regiment fire, was forced to land in the field where it was captured by Albanian combat units. The Greek pilot was captured and imprisoned as a prisoner of war.

Third Operation
In April 1952, a Spinoage Greek pilot Nikos Akrivojanis of the CIA is captured by Albanian Air Force soldiers. He is said to have landed as he wanted to flee Greece because of the government but he was in Albania for a covert operation. The Albanian soldiers arrested him while he was spying on the Albanian authorities while in captivity, so he was arrested during the trial on December 13, 1953 and on August 16, 1954 he was executed by an Albanian execute commando.

First Albanian Air Force incident against the US Air Force
on December 23, 1957, an American Lockheed T-33 fighter jet violated Albanian airspace. Two MiG-15 aircraft took off from Kuçova airbase, piloted by Anastas Ngjela and Mahmut Hysa.

Major Howard J.Curran was surrounded and forced to land on the unfinished runway of the Rinas airport. The plane was seized and Major Howard J.Curran was taken prisoner. He was later released on January 11, 1958, while the plane was placed in the Gjirokastra castle museum, where it is still today.

References